The Operations against the Mohmands, Bunerwals and Swatis were carried out by the Indian Army during World War I. The first operation began at the start of 1915, with a raid by the Mohmand tribe near the Shabkadr Fort in Peshawar. In April operations continued against the Mohmands when 2,000 tribesmen attacked the troops of the 1st (Peshawar) Division and were defeated near Hafiz Kor.

The Operations against all three tribes (Mohmands, Bunerwals and Swatis) lasted between 17 August–28 October. These three tribes inhabit the northern half of the Peshawar district. Fighting began with the defeat of about 3,500 Bunerwals near Rustam on the 17 August, and ended with the rout of 3,000 Bajauris near the village of Wuch north of Chakdara. Another six small engagements were fought; the most important was on 5 September at Hafiz Kor, when 10,000 tribesmen were defeated.   

The Mohmands continued their raids resulting in the construction of the Mohmand blockade or fortified wall spanning the Mohmand border.

See also
Charles Hull was awarded the Victoria Cross for his actions during this conflict
Uprisings against Entente Powers during WWI

Bibliography
Notes

References

 - Total pages: 256 

Military history of British India 
Military history of Khyber Pakhtunkhwa 
Battles of World War I involving British India
Mohmand campaigns